Pentti Elo (10 June 1929 – 4 June 1991) was a Finnish field hockey player. He competed in the men's tournament at the 1952 Summer Olympics.

References

External links
 

1929 births
1991 deaths
Finnish male field hockey players
Olympic field hockey players of Finland
Field hockey players at the 1952 Summer Olympics
People from Hämeenlinna
Sportspeople from Kanta-Häme